The Mixed team competition at the IBSF World Championships 2019 was held on March 3, 2019.

This would be the last World Championships with the mixed-sleds mixed team eventconsisting of one run each of men's skeleton, women's skeleton, 2-man bobsleigh, and 2-women bobsleighfirst introduced at the 2007 championships. The 2020 championships would see the introduction of a skeleton-only mixed team event, consisting of one run each of men's and women's skeleton.

Results
The race was started at 16:04.

References

Mixed team